The Austin Whippet was a British single-seat light aircraft designed and built by the Austin Motor Company just after the First World War. It was a small single-seat biplane, intended to be an inexpensive aircraft for the amateur private pilot, and a small number were built before Austin abandoned aircraft production.

Development and design
In 1919, John Kenworthy, chief designer of the motor manufacturer Austin Motor Company, (who had built large numbers of aircraft under license during the First World War) designed a small single-seater light aircraft in order to cash in on an expected boom in private flying. The resulting aircraft, named the Austin Whippet, was a small single-seat biplane of mixed construction, with a fabric covered steel tube fuselage, and single-bay, folding wooden wings. The wings avoided the need for rigging wires by use of streamlined steel lift struts.

The first prototype, powered by a two-cylinder horizontally opposed engine, flew in 1919, receiving its Airworthiness Certificate in December that year. Production aircraft were powered by a six-cylinder Anzani air-cooled radial, and four more aircraft followed before Austin abandoned aircraft production in 1920, when it realised that the postwar depression was severely limiting aircraft sales.

Operational history
Of the five aircraft built, two were sold to New Zealand, while another was sent by its purchaser to Argentina. One of the New Zealand aircraft, serial AU.4/ZK-ACR, remained in existence at Kai Iwi in the 1940s.

An accurate replica of Whippet K-158 is currently on display at the Aeroventure South Yorkshire Aircraft Museum in Doncaster, UK.

A Replica K.158/BAPC.207 South Yorkshire Aircraft Museum at Doncaster.

Specifications

Notes

References

 "The Austin "Whippet"". Flight, 14 August 1919. Vol. XI, no. 33, pp. 1076–1078. Technical description with photographs and scale drawings.
 "The Olympia Aero Show 1920". Flight, 15 July 1920. pp. 749–780.
 Gunston, Bill. World Encyclopedia of Aircraft Manufacturers, Stroud, UK: Sutton Publishing, 2nd edition, 2005. .
Jackson, A.J. British Civil Aircraft since 1919: Volume I. London:Putnam, 1974. .

External links

Austin Memories: Aircraft Production

1910s British sport aircraft
Whippet
Single-engined tractor aircraft
Biplanes
Aircraft first flown in 1919